The Fishing Show is a New Zealand television program about all types of sports fishing. Host Matt Watson gained worldwide attention for successfully catching a black marlin, whilst jumping from a helicopter, although this later was proven and owned up to by Matt to be a hoax, it has gained him the nickname "Gannet Man".

The show started as a low budget production in Northland in New Zealand but has now been picked up by the Discovery and Animal Planet channels and will be broadcast in the US in October 2009. Excerpts from the show have been a hit on YouTube where David Letterman learnt of it.  When interviewed on The Late Show, Matt said, "...doing my job, you need balls".

Episodes

Season 1

Best of The Fishing Show

Season 2

Series 3: The ITM Vanuatu Fishing Challenge

Season 4

Season 5

Season 11

Season 12

Season 13

References

External links
Matt Watson interview on The Rock radio station
Official website
TV3 ITM Fishing Episodes On Demand

2004 New Zealand television series debuts
2016 New Zealand television series endings
2000s New Zealand television series
2010s New Zealand television series
English-language television shows
Fishing television series
New Zealand sports television series
Three (TV channel) original programming
TVNZ 1 original programming